The Bishop of Greenland is a diocesan bishop of the Church of Denmark, and the leader of the Church of Greenland, which is an episcopal church in the Lutheran tradition.

History
Historically (before the Reformation) the Bishop of Greenland was known as the Bishop of Garðar. After the reformation, the diocese fell into disuse. In 1984 Kristian Mørch was appointed as vice-bishop to oversee and work in Greenland as a resident bishop. It was only in 1993 that a diocese was once more established in Greenland with its name changed to the Diocese of Greenland and the bishop known as the bishop of Greenland. Kristian Mørch became the first bishop.

Bishops of Greenland

Kristian Mørch (1993–1995)
Sofie Petersen (1995–2020), an accomplished theologian. During her episcopacy she personally oversaw the introduction of a new translation of the Bible in Greenlandic, as well as a Greenlandic language hymnal, and a Greenlandic edition of the (originally Danish language) prayer book of the Church of Denmark.
Paneeraq Siegstad Munk became Bishop of Greenland on 1 December 2020, the third Bishop since the re-establishment of the diocese in Greenland.

References

External links
 http://groenlandsstift.gl

Greenland
Lutheranism in Greenland
Lutheran World Federation members
National churches
Members of the World Council of Churches
Church of Denmark